Cladonia alaskana, commonly known as the Alaskan cup lichen, is a species of cup lichen in the  Cladoniaceae family. It is found in and around the arctic circle, growing in acidic soils. 40-80 mm tall and up to 2 mm in diameter. This species grows over boulders in heath and tussock tundras.

References

alaskana
Lichens of the Arctic